Chetana Das (born in Shillong, Meghalaya, India is an Indian actress from Assam. She is popular face in Assamese cinema for comic roles. She is the comedy queen of Assamese film industry.

Early life
Chetana Das was born in Shillong. She completed her graduation from Darrang College, Tezpur in Assam. Her first drama was Jyoti Prasad Agarwala's Sunit Konwori, and also got the award of best actress in that drama from Tezpur Multipurpose Girls School.

Her husband, Bimaladanda Das, died in 2020, during the COVID-19 pandemic.

Selected filmography

References

External links 
 

Actresses in Assamese cinema
Living people
Indian film actresses
20th-century Indian actresses
21st-century Indian actresses
People from Shillong
Actresses in Bengali cinema
Actresses from Meghalaya
Year of birth missing (living people)